Daydar-e Olya (also Romanized as Dāydār-e ‘Olyā and Daydar Olya; also known as Dāidār ‘Uliya, Daydar, Dāyedār, and Dāyedār-e Bālā) is a village in Ijrud-e Pain Rural District, Halab District, Ijrud County, Zanjan Province, Iran. At the 2006 census, its population was 142, in 43 families.

References 

Populated places in Ijrud County